Rhode Island's 3rd congressional district is an obsolete district.  It had a short tenure (1913–1933). In its final configuration, it covered Providence and most of its inner ring suburbs. It was eliminated after the 1930 Census and split between the 1st and 2nd districts. The 3rd's last representative, Francis Condon subsequently won re-election in the 1st district.

List of members representing the district

References 

 Congressional Biographical Directory of the United States 1774–present

03
Former congressional districts of the United States
1913 establishments in Rhode Island
1933 disestablishments in Rhode Island
Constituencies established in 1913
Constituencies disestablished in 1933